Pontibacter is a strictly aerobic bacterial genus from the family of Cytophagaceae.

Species
Pontibacter comprises the following species:

P. actiniarum
P. akesuensis
P. amylolyticus
P. aurantiacus
P. brevis
P. chinhatensis
P. deserti
P. diazotrophicus
P. humi
P. indicus
P. korlensis 
P. litorisediminis
P. locisalis
P. lucknowensis
P. mucosus 
P. niistensis
P. odishensis
P. populi
P. ramchanderi 
P. roseus
P. ruber
P. rugosus 
P. saemangeumensis
P. soli
P. toksunensis 
P. ummariensis
P. virosus
P. xinjiangensis
P. yuliensis

References

Further reading
 
 
 
 
 
 
 

Cytophagia
Bacteria genera